The following radio stations broadcast on AM frequency 740 kHz: 740 AM is a Canadian clear-channel frequency; CFZM in Toronto, Ontario, Canada is the dominant Class A, clear-channel station on 740 AM.

In Argentina 
 LRH 251 in Chaco
 Radio Rebelde in Buenos Aires. (not the same station as the Radio Rebelde network of stations in Cuba)
 La Carretera in Allen, Río Negro.

In Canada 
Stations in bold are clear-channel stations.

In Colombia 
 HJNS in Valledupar, Cesar

In Cuba 
 Radio Angulo in Sagua de Tánamo, Holguín

In Mexico 
 XECAQ-AM in Puerto Morelos, Quintana Roo
 XEKV-AM in Villahermosa, Tabasco
 XELTZ-AM in El Puertecito, Aguascalientes
 XEPOR-AM in Putla de Guerrero, Oaxaca
 XEQN-AM in Torreon, Coahuila
 XEVAY-AM in Puerto Vallarta, Jalisco

In the United States

External links
 FCC list of radio stations on 740kHz

References

Lists of radio stations by frequency